Parkland Corporation (formerly Parkland Fuel Corporation) is a Calgary, Alberta-based energy and retail company. Parkland operates gas stations under the Pioneer, Columbia Fuels, Ultramar, Chevron, and Fas Gas Plus brands, as well as franchised Esso locations. The company holds the rights to the convenience store brand On the Run in Canada and most of the United States, and franchises White Spot's fast food restaurant chain Triple O's in Alberta, British Columbia, and Ontario. Parkland also operates commercial oil and gas  businesses under the Bluewave Energy, Sparlings, and Ultramar brands.

It is the largest independent fuel retailing company in Canada, as well as the second-largest convenience store operator.  It is listed on the Toronto Stock Exchange, with a market capitalization of $3.9 billion as of March 2018.

History 
Parkland Industries was founded as Parkland Beef Industries, a publicly traded cattle feedlot.  In 1975, it was acquired by Jack Donald, and renamed Parkland Industries.  Donald had previously founded and sold a chain of retail gas stations called Parkland Oil Products Ltd.  At Parkland Industries, Donald pivoted the company from cattle to fuel retailing; it established Fas Gas Plus, a western Canadian gas station chain, in 1977.  In its early years, the company was headquartered in Red Deer, Alberta; it moved to Calgary in the mid-2010s.

In the following 30 years, the company grew significantly, in the context of offloading of retail gas operations by larger, integrated oil companies.  By the end of 2012, the company had 720 gas stations and $4.1 billion in annual revenue.  In 2010, it renamed itself Parkland Fuel Corporation. In 2020, it renamed itself to Parkland Corporation.

In 2013, Parkland acquired Elbow River Marketing, with 1,400 rail cars.  in late 2014, it announced the acquisition of Pioneer Energy, an Ontario gas station chain with 393 stations, for $378 million.  The deal increased the company's station count to over 1000, and was part of a larger acquisition strategy by the company.

In August 2016, the company announced the acquisition of most of CST Brands' Canadian assets for $965 million, as part of that company's acquisition by Alimentation Couche-Tard for $4 billion. This included the majority of the Ultramar chain, including 490 retail locations and 72 cardlocks in Ontario, Quebec and Atlantic Canada. The sale gave Parkland a total of just over 1,500 retail locations.

As part of Imperial Oil's exit from retail location ownership, Parkland also acquired the remaining On the Run franchise network, Canadian trademarks, and 17 Esso-branded gas stations. 

In 2017, Parkland acquired Chevron's Canadian downstream fuel operations for $1.5 billion. As part of the deal, the company acquired the Burnaby Refinery in Burnaby, British Columbia, and increased its station count to 1800.

In October 2018, Parkland announced it would acquire 75% of SOL Investments, a retail gas station operator based in the Caribbean, for $1.57 billion.

In February 2020, Parkland renewed its agreement with British Columbia-based restaurant chain White Spot to operate Triple-O's locations as part of its Town Pantry (Chevron) and On the Run-branded convenience stores, with plans to extend the chain into Alberta and Ontario as well.

In September 2020, Parkland USA acquired from Couche-Tard the rights to the On the Run brand in most U.S. states, with an intent to further-expand the chain into a North American operation.

In 2021, Parkland acquired 156 gas stations from Husky Energy for $156 million.  These stations are located on Vancouver Island as well as the metropolitan areas of Calgary, Toronto and Vancouver.

In January 2022, Parkland acquired frozen-food retailer M&M Food Market for $332 million. The purchase was part of a broader foray into food service by Parkland, in order to diversify its business beyond fuel retail (especially amid the growth of the electric vehicle market). Parkland planned to offer M&M products as part of On the Run's product line, while also maintaining its standalone locations and other distribution agreements. In late October 2022, Parkland announced a deal with U.S.-based EV charger company FreeWire Technologies to install EV chargers at 25 locations across British Columbia.

Operations 

Parkland's three businesses are retail gas stations, commercial fuel distribution, and fuel supply and wholesaling.

Its retail gas station brands in Canada include (with number of sites owned or franchised, as of 2019):
 Ultramar (634 sites, primarily in Atlantic Canada, Quebec, and Ontario), 
 Esso (634 sites)
 FasGas (186 sites, primarily in Western Canada),
 Pioneer (170 sites, primarily in Ontario),
 Chevron (193 sites, primarily in British Columbia and parts of Alberta)
 Race Trac (58 sites) — a franchised brand with independently run locations (unrelated to the U.S. chain RaceTrac)
 29 other sites
As of the end of 2019, the company has 1863 stations in its network, of which it owns 641. Unlike gas retailing operations owned by integrated oil and gas companies, which generally buy from a single supplier, Parkland sources its fuel from multiple suppliers. In October 2019, Parkland partnered with CIBC to launch Journie, a loyalty program accepted at Chevron, FasGas, Pioneer, and Ultramar locations.

In addition to its retail arm, Parkland distributes fuel, including propane, diesel, and heating oil, to mainly commercial customers. It operates under various brands, including Bluewave Energy, Sparlings, and Ultramar.

In British Columbia, Parkland has historically been a franchise of the local restaurant chain White Spot, operating Triple-O's locations as part of its gas stations in the province. In 2016, Parkland acquired the On the Run brand and franchise network in Canada from Imperial Oil. The company has since begun to utilize On the Run in conjunction with its own retail petroleum brands to leverage its recognition, and introduced a refreshed version of the brand in 2018. Parkland began to expand the relaunched On the Run brand into the United States in 2020. In January 2022, Parkland announced plans to establish a new concept for standalone On the Run convenience stores in high-traffic urban locations, which will feature M&M products.

References

External links

Companies listed on the Toronto Stock Exchange
Companies based in Calgary
Gas stations in Canada
Automotive fuel retailers
Oil companies of Canada